Gallerucidia is a genus of beetles in the family Carabidae, containing the following species:

 Gallerucidia basinotata Chaudoir, 1872
 Gallerucidia championi Bates, 1883
 Gallerucidia dimidata Chaudoir, 1872
 Gallerucidia erotyloides Bates, 1883
 Gallerucidia octonotata Chaudoir, 1872

References

Lebiinae